Tom Rogers (born 17 December 1998) is a Welsh international rugby union player. A wing or fullback, he plays rugby for the Scarlets.

Club career
Rogers came through the ranks at Cefneithin RFC before transferring to nearby Tumble RFC for youth rugby from where he was picked up by Scarlets academy. Rogers made his senior rugby debut with Tumble RFC before transferring to Llanelli RFC semi-pros.

Rogers made his Pro 14 debut in the away defeat to Edinburgh towards the end of the 2018 season. In February 2020, Rogers scored his first Scarlets try in a bonus point victory over the Southern Kings.

In 2022, Rogers extended his contract with the Scarlets.

International career
Rogers was part of the Wales U20 squad for the 2018 Six Nations Under 20s Championship. He played in four matches, and scored against Ireland and Italy.

Rogers was called into the Wales squad for the 2021 Summer Tests against Canada and Argentina. He made his debut against Canada on 3 July 2021, and played in the second test against Argentina.

Rogers also represented Wales Sevens during the 2018–19 World Rugby Sevens Series.

References

External links 

 Wales profile
 Scarlets profile

1998 births
Living people
Scarlets players
Rugby union wings
Wales international rugby union players